EarthFest Singapore is a comprehensive festival celebrating sustainability in Singapore and first took place on 26 September 2015. The second festival occurred on 12 February 2017.

The event is a collaboration between many different businesses and organisations in Singapore with the purpose of encouraging sustainability. The event has components of a food festival - as an international food fair of foods with lower environmental footprints, a farmer's market and bazaar, and a music festival which features live music from local talent, edutainment is covered with a carnival with environmentally themed educational games.

EarthFest also screens documentaries and has talks about sustainability topics given by various experts in Singapore. It is a low-waste festival, incorporating elements of the circular and sharing economies.

History
Michael Broadhead is the volunteer director of the festival.  The event is in collaboration with Marina Barrage.

Venue
The festival at Marina Barrage is accessible via Circle MRT line or Downtown MRT line via Bayfront MRT station, by walking and by Bicycle (parking slots available).

See also
 Vegfest
 Earth Hour, Earth Day
 Shambala Festival
 The Transition Decade
 Sustainability
 Sustainable living
 Plant-based diet

References

External links
Official website

2015 establishments in Singapore
Annual events in Singapore
Environmentalism in Singapore
Food and drink festivals in Singapore
Music festivals in Singapore
Festivals established in 2015
September events
Sustainability in Singapore
Vegetarian festivals
Vegetarianism in Singapore